Ferenc Sánta (September 4, 1927 – June 6, 2008) was a Hungarian novelist and film screenwriter. He was awarded the József Attila Prize in 1956 and 1964, and the prestigious Kossuth Prize in 1973. He was born in Braṣov and died in Budapest.

Selected works
Sokan voltunk, 1954
Téli virágzás, 1956
Farkasok a küszöbön, 1961
Az ötödik pecsét, 1963
Húsz óra, 1963
Az áruló, 1966
Isten a szekéren, 1970
Kicsik és nagyok, 1982
A szabadság küszöbén
Halálnak halála, 1994

Filmography
Húsz óra (1965) (based on his novel; English title, Twenty Hours). The film won the Grand Prix at the 1965 Moscow International Film Festival, and the UNICRIT Award at the 1965 Venice Film Festival.
Az Ötödik pecsét (1976) (based on his novel; English title, The Fifth Seal). The film won the Golden Prize at the 1977 Moscow International Film Festival. It was nominated to the Golden Berlin Bear at Berlin International Film Festival in 1977.
Éjszaka (1989) (writer).

Awards
József Attila Prize (1956 and 1964)
Arany Nimfa Prize (Monte Carlo, 1970)
Kossuth Prize (1973)
Magyar Köztársasági Érdemrend Tisztikeresztje (1993)
Hazám Prize (2004)
Magyar Muvészetért Prize (2004)

References

1927 births
2008 deaths
Male screenwriters
20th-century Hungarian novelists
Hungarian male novelists
20th-century Hungarian male writers
Burials at Farkasréti Cemetery
People from Brașov
20th-century Hungarian screenwriters